Hanna Lundell (born 6 July 1998) is a Swedish footballer who plays as a forward.

Honours 
Rosengård
Winner
 Damallsvenskan: 2015

Runner-up
 Svenska Cupen: 2014–15

External links 
 

1998 births
Living people
Swedish women's footballers
FC Rosengård players
Damallsvenskan players
Women's association football forwards